Siorac-en-Périgord is a commune in the Dordogne department in Nouvelle-Aquitaine in southwestern France. Siorac-en-Périgord station has rail connections to Bordeaux, Périgueux, Sarlat-la-Canéda and Agen.

Population

See also
Communes of the Dordogne département

References

Communes of Dordogne